The 2001–02 season will be Ferencvárosi TC's100th competitive season, 100th consecutive season in the OTP Bank Liga and 102nd year in existence as a football club.

Transfers

Summer 

In:

Out:

Winter 

In:

Out:

Nemzeti Bajnokság I

First stage

Second stage

Results summary

Results by round

Matches

First stage

Second stage

Hungarian Cup

UEFA Champions League

Second qualifying round

Statistics

Appearances and goals
Last updated on 25 May 2002.

|-
|colspan="14"|Out to loan:

|-
|colspan="14"|Players no longer at the club:

|}

Top scorers
Includes all competitive matches. The list is sorted by shirt number when total goals are equal.
Last updated on 25 May 2002.

Disciplinary record
Includes all competitive matches. Players with 1 card or more included only.

Last updated on 25 May 2002.

Overall
{|class="wikitable"
|-
|Games played || 41 (38 Nemzeti Bajnokság I, 1 Hungarian Cup and 2 UEFA Champions League)
|-
|Games won || 21 (21 Nemzeti Bajnokság I, 0 Hungarian Cup and 0 UEFA Champions League)
|-
|Games drawn || 9 (6 Nemzeti Bajnokság I, 1 Hungarian Cup and 2 UEFA Champions League)
|-
|Games lost || 11 (11 Nemzeti Bajnokság I, 0 Hungarian Cup and 0 UEFA Champions League)
|-
|Goals scored || 67
|-
|Goals conceded || 40
|-
|Goal difference || +27
|-
|Yellow cards || 66
|-
|Red cards || 7
|-
|rowspan="1"|Worst discipline ||  Attila Kriston (9 , 1 )
|-
|rowspan="1"|Best result || 5–0 (H) v Haladás - (Nemzeti Bajnokság I) - 10-4-2002
|-
|rowspan="1"|Worst result || 0–3 (H) v Dunaferr - (Nemzeti Bajnokság I) - 9-11-2001
|-
|rowspan="1"|Most appearances ||  Lajos Szűcs (40 appearances)
|-
|rowspan="1"|Top scorer ||  Aleksandar Jović (11 goals)
|-
|Points || 72/123 (58.53%)
|-

References

External links
 Official Website
 UEFA
 fixtures and results

2001-02
Hungarian football clubs 2001–02 season